Joey Muthengi is a media personality and actress. Her entry into the Kenyan media industry came through being a radio personality on 98.4 Capital FM from 2009-2013 where she hosted and produced the wildly popular youth show 'Hits Not Homework. Most recently (June 2016 – Present), as part of the new re-branded Power Breakfast show on Citizen TV, Joey Muthengi now co-hosts the daily show with Fred Indimuli and Willis Raburu. While at Citizen TV, she also co hosted an entertainment show 10 over 10.Joey later on in 2018,quit her job from Royal Media.

Early life
Joey was born on 2nd August in 1985 in  Kijabe, Rift Valley and moved to the United States when she was 2-years-old. She returned home and attended Rift Valley Academy, later moving to the USA where she attended Hope College pursuing a double major in Communications and Business Management. Joey has a brother (David Muthengi) who is in the limelight, an investment analyst, a musician and was a host at Rauka TV Show on Citizen, who is popularly known as Holy Dave.

Career
Between 2011 and 2014, Joey served as the 1st ever Kenyan VJ (Video Jockey) for the South-African based music channel Channel O where she represented Kenyan music, entertainment, and culture to the rest of the continent. In 2013 she hosted Season 6 of the largest reality music show in East Africa 'Tusker Project Fame', on Citizen TV having previously been involved with the franchise on 'Tusker All Stars' which aired in 2011. In 2015 she began hosting the daily Drivetime show on Hot 96 Fm. She also hosted  ‘Sugar and Spice’ on Ebru TV. Joey Muthengi worked at the Royal Media Services at Citizen Tv as 10 over 10 host where she co hosted with Willis Raburu. She left the Citizen TV after landing in problems with her employer after being used by Betin company, which is a betting company, as their brand ambassador. About one year later on her social media page, she talked about the tough times she experienced after leaving Citizen Tv, but confirmed she is in a better state and contented.

Personal life
Joey has a passion for music and spoken word poetry. 
Joey's brother is a gospel musician Holy Dave

Philanthropy
Joey is the co-founder and a Director of the Muthengi Foundation, a non-profit charity organization that aims to develop economic empowerment through education.

Filmography
As an actress, she has been part of several local Tv drama series, including the award-winning Family drama 'Changing Times' which aired on Kenya Television Network from 2010–2012. She was also a lead character in the drama series 'Prem' which first aired on KTN in 2013-2014 and later on Africa Magic on DSTV.

television

References

Kenyan television actresses
1985 births
Living people
Hope College alumni